In shogi, Iijima Bishop Pullback or Iijima's Back Bishop (飯島流引き角 Iijima-ryuu hiki kaku) is a less common defensive Static Rook opening used against a Ranging Rook opponent. It has been used in both Black and White positions by professional players.

It is characterized by not opening the bishop's diagonal with a pawn push (P-34 or P-76) and instead moving the bishop back (to 31 if played by White or 79 if played by Black) so that it can then exit one's camp via the central (5th) file, which has been opened by advancing the central pawn. With the bishop out of way, it possible to castle the king into a Left Mino castle.

The opening is named after professional player Eiji Iijima who has won the Masuda Award in 2009 for developing the strategy.

vs Central Rook

The example here is an Iijima Bishop Pullback position played by White against a Central Rook position played by Black.

White first suggests their intention to play a Static Rook position while Black hints at a Central Rook position. 

After Black pushes their rook pawn to the mid rank, Black shows their clear intention for Central Rook.

From this point, White starts the Iijima Bishop Pullback development by moving their left silver straight up to make way for a space in which to pull back their bishop. Black starts castling their king rightward, and White pulls their bishop back to rank 1, which allows for a possible pawn and bishop exchange on the eighth file at the 86 square focal point.

In later development, White's left silver and right gold have been moved to construct a Left Mino castle. 

In the last diagram, both players have (a) finished moving their kings into their castles, (b) developed their attacking silvers further, and (c) exchanged their central file pawns.

vs Fourth File Rook

1. P-76 P-84, 2. P-16 P-14, 3. P-66 S-62, 4. R-68 P-54, 5. S-38 S-32

See also

 Static Rook

References

Bibliography

External links

 Reijer Grimbergen's Shogi page: Fujii Takeshi vs Habu Yoshiharu 24th Asahi Open Match Game 2 (2006)
 2015 Ōi tournament: Yasumitsu Satō vs Tatsuya Sugai May 29 · Tatsuya Sugai's Ranging Rook counter to the Iijima Bishop Pullback strategy
 Tokuni System  · Evernote document by Shun Tokuni on playing against Iijima's Bishop Pullback
 Shogi Buzz YouTube channel: Hikikaku strategy opening

Shogi openings
Static Rook openings
Static Rook vs Ranging Rook openings